The 1946 Wake Forest Demon Deacons football team was an American football team that represented Wake Forest University during the 1946 college football season. In its tenth season under head coach Peahead Walker, the team compiled a 6–3 record and finished in a tie for tenth place in the Southern Conference.

Wake Forest quarterback Nick Sacrinty ranked seventh nationally with 822 passing yards and fourth with 12 interceptions. End Red O'Quinn ranked third nationally with 29 pass receptions.

Schedule

After the season

The 1947 NFL Draft was held on December 16, 1946. The following Demon Deacons were selected.

References

Wake Forest
Wake Forest Demon Deacons football seasons
Wake Forest Demon Deacons football